The Viceroy of Zhili, fully referred to in Chinese as the Governor-General of Zhili and Surrounding Areas Overseeing Military Affairs and Food Production, Manager of Waterways, Director of Civil Affairs, was one of eight regional Viceroys during the Qing dynasty. The Viceroy of Zhili was an important post because the province of Zhili, which literally means "directly ruled", was the area surrounding the imperial capital, Beijing. The administrative centre was in Tianjin even though the provincial capital was in Baoding. The Viceroy's duties as well as responsibilities have never been defined entirely. Generally speaking, the Viceroy oversaw the military and civil affairs of Zhili, Shandong and Henan provinces. The Viceroy of Zhili was also highly influential in imperial court politics.

History
The office was first created on 30 September 1649 during the reign of the Shunzhi Emperor, but was later abolished on 1 June 1658. On 23 November 1661, during the reign of the Kangxi Emperor, the office was recreated, however abolished again later on 28 July 1669. After the Yongzheng Emperor restored it on 14 December 1724, the office had remained in place until the fall of the Qing dynasty in 1912.

From 1870 onwards, the Viceroy of Zhili concurrently held the position of "Beiyang Trade Minister"; cf. "Nanyang Trade Minister" held by the Viceroy of Liangjiang.

47 people had held the position from 1649 to 1912. Among them, the more notable ones included Tang Zhiyu, Fang Guancheng, Zeng Guofan, Ronglu and Yuan Shikai.

List of Viceroys of Zhili

References

 

History of Hebei
 
1649 establishments in China